Rajapur Assembly constituency is one of the 288 Vidhan Sabha (legislative assembly) constituencies of Maharashtra state in western India.

Overview
Rajapur constituency is one of the five Vidhan Sabha constituencies located in the Ratnagiri district. It comprises the entire Rajapur and Lanja tehsils and part of Sangameshwar tehsil of the district.

Rajapur is part of the Ratnagiri-Sindhudurg Lok Sabha constituency along with five other Vidhan Sabha segments, namely Ratnagiri and Chiplun in Ratnagiri district and Kankavli, Kudal and Sawantwadi in the Sindhudurg district.

Members of Legislative Assembly

See also
 Rajapur
 List of constituencies of Maharashtra Vidhan Sabha

References

Assembly constituencies of Maharashtra
Ratnagiri district